Qusai Emad Al-Khawaldeh (1994 – 24 November 2013) was a Jordanian footballer, who primarily played as a midfielder.

Qusai Emad Al-Khawaldeh died of asphyxiation on 24 November 2013, aged 19, in his hometown of Amman.

References

1994 births
2013 deaths
Deaths from asphyxiation
Sportspeople from Amman
Jordanian footballers
Al-Faisaly SC players
Association football midfielders